Staraya Kazanovka is a rural locality (a village) in Partizansky Selsoviet, Meleuzovsky District, Bashkortostan, Russia. The population was 37 as of 2010. There are 2 streets.

Geography 
Staraya Kazanovka is located 22 km northwest of Meleuz (the district's administrative centre) by road. Troitskoye is the nearest rural locality.

References 

Rural localities in Meleuzovsky District